Cornelis de Graeff (23 August 1671,  Amsterdam – 16 February 1719, Ilpendam) was a member of the family De Graeff, a prominent regent family from the Dutch Golden Age.

Biography 
His parents were Pieter de Graeff and Jacoba Bicker, his younger brother was Johan de Graeff, the Lord of the semisouverain Lordship Zuid-Polsbroek. His uncle was Johan de Witt, Statesman of the True Freedom, husband of Wendela Bicker, sister of Cornelis' mother Jacoba.

Cornelis de Graeff was a Canon of St. Pieter at Utrecht. Most of the time he resided at his castle Ilpenstein. He also owned Bronstee, a country estate near Heemstede. De Graeff was mentally disturbed and remained unmarried. Since his father's death in 1707 he was under the tutelage of Jacobus de Fremeri, and died at his castle Ilpenstein on February 16, 1719. His successor as lord of Purmerland and Ilpendam was his cousin Gerrit de Graeff. Cornelis' burial chapel is in the Oude Kerk in Amsterdam, in the Sint Cornelis choir, the family grave of the De Graeff family. 

At Ilpenstein castle De Graeff had a famous art collection, including Rembrandts Jacob Blessing the Sons of Joseph (the sitters were Wendela de Graeff and her two sons) and the Portrait of Andries de Graeff. The two famous paintings, both by Rembrandt, can be seen today at Wilhelmshöhe in Kassel. De Graeff also owned Frans Halsens painting Catharina Hooft with her Nurse. In 1710 a copy of Rembrandt's 'The Night Watch' was assigned to him. Around 1712, De Graeff's curator De Fremery sold the piece to Pieter van der Lip. Rembrandt expert Abraham Bredius suspected that a second copy of 'The Night Watch', painted by Gerrit Lundens, had gone to Cornelis de Graeff; which turned out to be correct. A painting after Lundens was also present at Pieter de Graeff, after the well-known drawing in the album by De Graeffs uncle Frans Banninck Cocq. This album has been owned by the De Graeff family since 1678.

Notes

Literature
 Graeff, P. de (P. de Graeff Gerritsz en Dirk de Graeff van Polsbroek) Genealogie van de familie De Graeff van Polsbroek, Amsterdam 1882.
 Bruijn, J. H. de Genealogie van het geslacht De Graeff van Polsbroek 1529/1827, met bijlagen. De Built 1962-63.
 Elias, J.E., De Vroedschap van Amsterdam 1578-1795 (1903-1905 Haarlem), page 423
 Moelker, H.P., De heerlijkheid Purmerland en Ilpendam (1978 Purmerend), page 178

External links
 Cornelis de Graeff II. at Heren van Holland (nl)
 Biographie from his father Pieter de Graeff - Nieuw Nederlandsch biografisch woordenboek. part II
 Rembrandts Jacob Blessing the Sons of Joseph, Staatliche Museen Kassel (de)
 Rembrandts Portrait of Andries de Graeff, Staatliche Museen Kassel

1671 births
1719 deaths
Nobility from Amsterdam
Cornelis II., de Graeff
Lords of Purmerland and Ilpendam